The fourth season of the television drama series Winners & Losers will air in two parts on the Seven Network in Australia. Season 4A – comprising 13 episodes – began airing on 1 July 2014 and concluded airing on 23 September 2014, while Season 4B – comprising 13 episodes – began airing on 14 July 2015. Season four began immediately after the conclusion of the third season. Season four follows the lives of Jenny, Bec, Sophie, Frances and Sam two months on from the discovery that Frances is pregnant. Filming for the season began in February 2014 and wrapped in November 2014.

Production 
On 19 December 2013, it was announced that Seven had renewed Winners & Losers for a fourth season, set to air in 2014.

Julie McGauran, the head of Drama at Seven stated, "Winners & Losers is a show everyone loves working on. The contemporary vibe allows for great storytelling against a backdrop everyone can relate to. There's so much in store for our favourite girls as we follow them through triumph, tragedy and everything in between."

A fourth season was confirmed on 19 December 2013. A nine-month production commenced in Melbourne in February 2014. The first scripts for season four were delivered on 10 February 2014. The table read for season four was held on 25 February 2014. Filming for the fourth season began on 3 March 2014 and wrapped on 19 November 2014.

TV Week announced that season four, like season three, would be split into two batches of 13 episodes with the first half to air at the end of 2014 and the second half to air at the beginning of 2015.

Plot
This season is about having it all. Despite everything they've been through, Bec, Sophie, Jenny, Frances and Sam are as close as they've ever been to having the three key areas of life – love, work and home – firing on all cylinders. But when relationships, friendships, careers and aspirations are all tested, the girls will question if it is even possible to have it all? And if it is, do they really want it?

Cast

Main cast
 Melissa Bergland as Jenny Gross
 Virginia Gay as Frances James
 Zoe Tuckwell-Smith as Bec Gilbert (7 episodes)
 Melanie Vallejo as Sophie Wong
 Katherine Hicks as Sam MacKenzie
 Tom Wren as Doug Graham
 Sibylla Budd as Carla Hughes
 Francis Greenslade as Brian Gross (25 episodes)
 Denise Scott as Trish Gross (4 episodes)
 Nathin Butler as Luke MacKenzie (25 episodes)
 Nick Russell as Gabe Reynolds
 Laura Gordon as Izzy Hughes (16 episodes)
 Jack Pearson as Patrick Gross (2 episodes)
 Sarah Grace as Bridget Fitzpatrick

Recurring cast
 Jacob Holt as Cory Baxter (25 episodes)
 Paul Moore as Wes Fitzpatrick (13 episodes)
 Anne Phelan as Dot Gross (13 episodes)
 Laurence Brewer as Jack Macauley (13 episodes)
 Rupert Reid as Rob Hill (9 episodes)
 James Saunders as Pete Reeves (5 episodes)
 Anna Samson as Hayley Baxter (4 episodes)
 Susie Dee as Michelle Reynolds (4 episodes)

Guest cast
 Glenda Linscott as Lily Patterson (3 episodes)
 Katherine Tonkin as Nicole Jacobs (3 episodes)
 Ben Steel as Aden Thomas (3 episodes)
 Jesse Rosenfeld as Xavier England (3 episodes)
 Dieter Brummer as Jason Ross (2 episodes)
 PiaGrace Moon as Jasmine Patterson (2 episodes)
 Melissa Howard as Cassie Gormley (2 episodes)
 Kevin Kiernan-Molloy as Tyler Dale (2 episodes)
 Nell Feeney as Carolyn Gilbert (1 episode)
 Jessica Gower as Ava Murdoch (1 episode)
 Jeremy Stanford as Derek Watters (1 episode)
 Nicholas Bell as Keith Maxwell (1 episode)

Casting
Former General Hospital actor, Nathin Butler joined the series as Sam's brother Luke MacKenzie. Melissa Howard appeared in two episodes as Cassie Gormley, the ex-girlfriend of Gabe Reynolds. Former City Homicide actress, Katherine Tonkin was cast as Nicole Jacobs. While Dieter Brummer reprised his role of Jason Ross, the "right-guy wrong-time" ex of Bec Gilbert. Laurence Brewer portrays Jack Macauley, a new doctor at the hospital. Former Stingers actor, James Saunders appeared as "P-Dog" Pete Reeves in August. Laura Gordon joined the series as Carla's sister, Isobel "Izzy" Hughes. Jack Pearson and PiaGrace Moon will reprise their roles of Patrick Gross and Jasmine Patterson, respectively. Former Blue Heelers actor, Rupert Reid will appear as Rob Hill.

Episodes 

{| class="wikitable plainrowheaders" style="margin: auto; width: 100%"
|-
!! style="background-color:#E66BA6; text-align: center;" width=5%|No. inseries
!! style="background-color:#E66BA6; text-align: center;" width=5%|No. inseason
!! style="background-color:#E66BA6; text-align: center;" width=25%|Title
!! style="background-color:#E66BA6; text-align: center;" width=16%|Directed by
!! style="background-color:#E66BA6; text-align: center;" width=28%|Written by
!! style="background-color:#E66BA6; text-align: center;" width=14%|Original air date
!! style="background-color:#E66BA6; text-align: center;" width=7%|Australian viewers
|-

|}

Ratings 

Figures are OzTAM Data for the 5 City Metro areas.
Overnight - Live broadcast and recordings viewed the same night.
Consolidated - Live broadcast and recordings viewed within the following seven days.

DVD release

References

External links 
 

2014 Australian television seasons
2015 Australian television seasons
Split television seasons